Nelson R. Çabej (born November 17, 1939, in Gjirokastër, Albania) is a biologist and author.

Education 
He obtained his B.A. in veterinary science in 1961, followed by B.A. in chemistry in 1976, and finally completed his doctorate degree (PhD) in biology in 1986.

Career 
He worked as a veterinarian (1961–66 and 1975–1980), as immunologist (1970–1975), book editor (1980–1990) and biology lecturer (1985–1995). He lives in New Jersey with his family.

His multifaceted scientific research includes widely different research areas, extending from applied biology (epizootology), experimental molecular biology and immunology, genetics, evolution theory, development and epigenetics to the history, history of science, linguistics, philosophy, journalism, and translation.

Over the years, Çabej has penned over 100 articles and published 20 books in Albanian and English. Primarily, investigative contributions are in the evolutionary biology with emphasis in the role of epigenetics through the nervous system in the evolution of the animal. The theory, which is positively valued in peer reviewed journals, is presented in four publications, “The Epigenetic Principles of Evolution” (2012) and “Building the most Complex Structure on Earth” (2013).

Selected articles 
 
  - in the controversial and non-peer reviewed Medical Hypotheses}}

Selected books 

  (coauthored with B. Shehu)

Selected science translations

 Darwin, C. (1859) The Origin of Species. Translated from the English original (1859) publication into Albanian.
 Mendel, G. (1865). Versuche über Pflanzenhybriden. Translated from the German original, with an introduction for the Albanian readership
 Autochthonie der Albaner in der deurschen Forschung. A compilation of selected pieces from 12 German historians and linguists of the last three centuries about the autochthony and the Illyrian origins of Albanians. Translated from German. With an introduction for the Albanian readership.

References

Albanian veterinarians
Albanian male writers
1939 births
Living people
Albanian science writers
20th-century Albanian writers
21st-century Albanian writers
20th-century male writers